Brighthouse Financial, Inc. is one of the largest providers of annuities and life insurance in the United States, with $219 billion in total assets and approximately 2.6 million insurance policies and annuity contracts in-force (as of March 31, 2018).

Overview
On August 4, 2017, Brighthouse Financial completed its separation from MetLife and began trading on the Nasdaq stock exchange on August 7, 2017, under the symbol "BHF." Upon completion of the separation, MetLife retained a 19.2% stake in the company. In 2018, MetLife divested its remaining interest through a debt-for-equity exchange with four financial institutions that owned MetLife debt.

Headquartered in Charlotte, North Carolina, the company began selling annuity and life insurance under the Brighthouse Financial brand on March 6, 2017.

Separation from MetLife 
In January 2016, MetLife, Inc. announced its intention to separate a substantial portion of the company’s U.S. Retail segment, which focused on selling life insurance and annuities. The entities marked for separation into the new enterprise included: Brighthouse Life Insurance Company (formerly MetLife Insurance Company USA), Brighthouse Life Insurance Company of NY (formerly First MetLife Investors Insurance Company) and New England Life Insurance Company. On July 21, 2016, MetLife announced it would rebrand the business as Brighthouse Financial and on March 6, 2017 the company began selling annuity and life insurance under the Brighthouse Financial brand.

On August 4, 2017, Brighthouse Financial completed its separation from MetLife. The company began trading on the Nasdaq stock exchange on August 7, 2017 under the symbol "BHF".

Products 

Brighthouse Financial sells annuity and life insurance products to U.S. consumers through multiple independent distribution channels. These products are serviced by a third-party vendor "DXC Technology" instead of directly by Brighthouse Financial.

Company leadership 

Brighthouse Financial is led by President and Chief Executive Officer Eric Steigerwalt (formerly Executive Vice President of U.S. Retail Business at MetLife).

Additional members of the management team include:

Chief Financial Officer Edward Spehar (formerly treasurer at MetLife),

Chief Operating Officer Conor Murphy (formerly Chief Financial Officer for MetLife's Latin America region),

Chief Administrative Officer and General Counsel Christine DeBiase (formerly Lead Counsel to MetLife’s U.S. Retail Business),

Chief Investment Officer John Rosenthal (formerly Senior Managing Director at MetLife), and

Chief Marketing and Distribution Officer Myles Lambert (formerly Senior Vice President of MetLife’s Northeast Region for the MetLife Premier Client Group).

References

External links

MetLife
Companies based in Charlotte, North Carolina
Financial services companies established in 2016
American companies established in 2016
Corporate spin-offs
Companies listed on the Nasdaq
Insurance companies of the United States